is a district of Minato, Tokyo, Japan. It is home to Toei Mita Line subway stations including Onarimon Station and Uchisaiwaichō Station, as well as medical school Jikei University School of Medicine.

Education
Minato City Board of Education operates public elementary and junior high schools.

Nishishinbashi 1-3-chōme are zoned to Onarimon Elementary School (御成門小学校) and Onarimon Junior High School (御成門中学校).

References

Districts of Minato, Tokyo